The Bangladesh Taekwondo Federation is the national federation for Taekwondo and is responsible for governing the sport in Bangladesh. Kazi Morshed Hossain is the president and Mahmudul Islam Rana is the general secretary of the federation.

History
Bangladesh Taekwondo Federation was established in 1997. In January 2019, the South Korean government donated equipment to the Bangladesh Taekwondo Federation. In December 2019, Dipu Chakma, became the first Bangladeshi to win a gold medal in Taekwondo at the 13th South Asian Games.

References

Taekwondo in Bangladesh
National members of World Taekwondo
1997 establishments in Bangladesh
Sports organizations established in 1997
Taekwondo
Organisations based in Dhaka